Jonas Valančiūnas (born 6 May 1992) is a Lithuanian professional basketball player for the New Orleans Pelicans of the National Basketball Association (NBA). He was selected by the Toronto Raptors with the fifth overall pick in the 2011 NBA draft. At the 2019 trade deadline, he was traded to the Memphis Grizzlies. In the 2021 offseason he was traded to the New Orleans Pelicans.

Valančiūnas has been a member of the Lithuania men's national basketball team since age 19. He won two EuroBasket silver medals in EuroBasket 2013 and EuroBasket 2015, earning All-Tournament honours in the latter. Valančiūnas also appeared in the documentary The Other Dream Team.

Professional career

Perlas Vilnius (2008–2010)
Valančiūnas started playing professionally for Perlas in 2008. During the 2008–09 season the team played in the Lithuanian National Basketball League (NKL), Lithuania's second strongest league, but moved up to the top-tier Lithuanian Basketball League (LKL) the following season. In January 2009 Valančiūnas signed a long-term contract with Lithuanian powerhouse Lietuvos Rytas, but, as Perlas was Lietuvos Rytas' daughter club, he did not immediately move to Lietuvos Rytas, staying in Perlas for the first half of the 2009–10 season.

Lietuvos Rytas Vilnius (2010–2012)
On 17 January 2010, Valančiūnas finally moved to Lietuvos Rytas. A month after that Lietuvos Rytas won the 2010 edition of Lithuanian Basketball Federation LKF Cup. While playing there, Valančiūnas has played in the LKL Finals three times, in 2010, 2011 and 2012. The team won the 2010 series against Žalgiris 4–3, but lost to the same team the following year 1–4 and 0-3 in 2012.

Valančiūnas became February's MVP in the VTB United League in 2012. Two months later he won the EuroCup Rising Star award and was named in the All-EuroCup squad. He averaged 10.8 ppg, 7.6 rpg and 1.6 bpg while shooting 63.4% from the field, leading Lietuvos Rytas to third place.

Valančiūnas participated in three LKL All-Star Games, the 2010, 2011 and 2012 LKL All-Star Games. During the 2011 All-Star Game Valančiūnas scored 18 points and grabbed 10 rebounds, helping the "Lithuanians" win the game. He was named as the 2011 LKL All-Star Game MVP. During the 2012 game he led his team to victory, scoring 25 points including one three-pointer, grabbing 13 rebounds and dishing out 6 assists. He won the MVP award once again.

Valančiūnas was named Lithuania Basketball Player of the Year three times – in December 2011, December 2012, and on 17 December 2014. He was also twice named the FIBA European Young Player of the Year, in February 2012 and February 2013.

Toronto Raptors (2012–2019)

2012–13 season

Valančiūnas was considered as a top prospect at the 2011 NBA draft, held on 23 June 2011, and was drafted fifth overall by the Toronto Raptors. He signed with the Raptors on 18 July 2012 and made his NBA debut on 31 October 2012, during a game against the Indiana Pacers. He recorded 12 points and 10 rebounds in 23 minutes of action as a starter, becoming the first Raptors rookie since Damon Stoudamire (1995) to record a double-double in his first game. On 5 April 2013, Valančiūnas was named Eastern Conference Rookie of the Month for games played in March. He ranked first among Eastern Conference rookies in averages per game in rebounds (7.3), blocks (1.07), and field goal percentage (.620). He also ranked second in free throw percentage (.822) and fourth in scoring (11.4 points per game), reaching double figures in points in 11 of his last 12 games during 6–31 March.

2013–14 season
On 22 July 2013, Valančiūnas was named MVP of the Las Vegas Summer League becoming the first non-American to win the award after averaging 19 points and 10 rebounds in four games.

On 27 December 2013, Valančiūnas recorded a then career-high 18 rebounds in a 95–83 win over the New York Knicks. On 9 April 2014, he scored a then career-high 26 points in a 125–114 win over the Philadelphia 76ers. Two days later, he recorded a then career-high 21 rebounds in a 108–100 loss to the New York Knicks. The Raptors finished as the third seed in the East Conference in 2013–14, and faced the sixth-seeded Brooklyn Nets in the first round of the playoffs. In Game 1 of the series, Valančiūnas recorded 17 points and 18 rebounds, surpassing Keon Clark's franchise record for most rebounds in a single playoff game. Valančiūnas also became the second Raptor ever to record a double-double in his playoff debut; the first was Tracy McGrady. The Raptors went on to lose the series 4–3.

2014–15 season

On 31 January 2015, Valančiūnas scored a then career-high 31 points in a 114–111 loss to the Detroit Pistons. Valančiūnas finished the 2014–15 season with a back-to-the-basket shot percentage of 51.3%, good for second in the NBA behind fellow Lithuanian Donatas Motiejūnas of the Houston Rockets, who was attacking with 53.4% this way. Valančiūnas was ranked second in field goal percentage category during the 2014–15 season.

2015–16 season
On 20 August 2015, Valančiūnas signed a four-year, $64 million contract extension with the Raptors. Prior to the start of the 2015–16 season, Valančiūnas was named the 57th (out of 400) best player in the league by ESPN, jumping 34 positions from the previous season when he was ranked 91st. On 22 November 2015, he was ruled out for six weeks with a fracture in his left hand. He returned to action on 28 December against the Chicago Bulls after missing 17 games with the injury. On 10 March 2016, in a win over the Atlanta Hawks, he recorded 10 points and 10 rebounds, his career-high 16th straight game scoring in double figures and his 16th double-double of the season. His double figure record ended at 17 games after re-injuring his left hand on 14 March against the Chicago Bulls, leaving the game with 2:25 remaining in the first quarter and did not return.

On 30 March 2016, Valančiūnas recorded 19 points and 9 rebounds in a 105–97 win over the Atlanta Hawks, helping the Raptors record a 50-win season for the first time in franchise history. On 1 April, he recorded 11 points, 14 rebounds and a career-best seven blocks in a 99–95 win over the Memphis Grizzlies. The Raptors finished the regular season as the second seed in the East with a 56–26 record.

In Game 1 of the Raptors' first round playoff series against the seventh-seeded Indiana Pacers, Valančiūnas set a franchise playoff record with 19 rebounds, surpassing his own mark set in 2014. In Game 2 of the series, Valančiūnas recorded a playoff career-high 23 points and 15 rebounds in a 98–87 win, tying the series a 1–1. The Raptors went on to win the series 4–3. In the second round, the Raptors faced the Miami Heat, but in Game 3 of the series, Valančiūnas went down with a sprained right ankle. He subsequently missed eight straight games, returning to action in Game 5 of the Eastern Conference Finals against the Cleveland Cavaliers. The Raptors went on to lose to the Cavaliers in Game 6, as the Raptors' deepest playoff run in franchise history came to an end with a 4–2 defeat.

2016–17 season
In the Raptors' season opener on 26 October 2016, Valančiūnas recorded a then career-high 32 points and 11 rebounds in a 109–91 win over the Detroit Pistons. On 10 January 2017, Valančiūnas grabbed a then career-high 23 rebounds to go with 18 points in a 114–106 win over the Boston Celtics. On 31 March 2017, Valančiūnas made team history in the third quarter of the Raptors' 111–100 win over the Indiana Pacers. He had 13 of his 17 rebounds during the quarter, setting a franchise mark for most in a single period. He also had 16 points for his team-leading 28th double-double of the season. He also established a career high during the game, surpassing the 714 rebounds he had in the 2013–14 season.

2017–18 season
On 11 January 2018, Valančiūnas had 15 points and a season-high 18 rebounds in a 133–99 win over the Cleveland Cavaliers. On 26 January 2018, he had a season-high 28 points and 14 rebounds in a 97–93 loss to the Utah Jazz. In Game 2 of the Raptors' first-round playoff series against the Washington Wizards, Valančiūnas had 19 points and 14 rebounds, as Toronto took a 2–0 lead in a playoff series for the first time in franchise history with a 130–119 win. It was his 12th playoff double-double, matching Antonio Davis for the most in Raptors history. He set the Raptors' playoff double-double record in Game 5 with 14 points and 13 rebounds. The Raptors went on to win the series in six games to move on to the second round. In Game 1 of the Raptors' second-round series against the Cleveland Cavaliers, Valančiūnas recorded 21 points and 21 rebounds in a 113–112 overtime loss. It marked the best double-double performance by a Raptors player in the franchise's playoff history. The Raptors went on to be swept by the Cavaliers for the second straight year.

2018–19 season
On 21 November 2018, Valančiūnas had season highs of 24 points and 13 rebounds in a 124–108 win over the Atlanta Hawks. On 5 December, he scored 18 of his season-high 26 in the fourth quarter of the Raptors' 113–102 win over the Philadelphia 76ers. On 13 December, he was ruled out for at least four weeks after undergoing surgery on his dislocated left thumb, an injury he sustained the previous night against the Golden State Warriors.

Memphis Grizzlies (2019–2021)
On 7 February 2019, Valančiūnas was traded, along with C. J. Miles, Delon Wright and a 2024 second-round draft pick, to the Memphis Grizzlies in exchange for Marc Gasol. On 12 February, after being medically cleared to return from the thumb injury, Valančiūnas made his debut for the Grizzlies, recording 23 points and 10 rebounds in a 108–107 loss to the San Antonio Spurs. On 20 March, Valančiūnas scored a then career-high 33 points and had 15 rebounds in the Grizzlies' 126–125 overtime win over the Houston Rockets. Two days later, he had 23 points and career-high 24 rebounds in a 123–119 overtime loss to the Orlando Magic. He set the franchise record for defensive rebounds in a game (23), surpassing Shareef Abdur-Rahim, who had 18 defensive boards twice. On 30 March, he set a then career high with 34 points to go with 20 rebounds (11 offensive) in a 120–115 win over the Phoenix Suns. It was a career-best sixth straight double-double for Valančiūnas, with the streak ending the next day against the Los Angeles Clippers after injuring his right ankle in the third quarter. On 1 April, he was ruled out for the rest of the season with a grade II right ankle sprain.

On 11 July 2019, Valančiūnas signed a reported three-year, $45 million contract with the Grizzlies. On 28 February 2020, Valančiūnas improved his career record by grabbing 25 rebounds (6 offensive), however his team lost 101–104 to the Sacramento Kings. On 29 February 2020, he scored 22 points, grabbed 20 rebounds and improved the Grizzlies club record (45 rebounds) for the most rebounds in two consecutive games (previously the record belonged to Zach Randolph who had 42 rebounds in 2009), helping his team to defeat the Western Conference leaders Los Angeles Lakers 105–88. On 13 August 2020, Valančiūnas achieved his career's first triple-double: 26 points (including 2/3 three-pointers), 19 rebounds, 12 assists and led his team to a crucial victory, which secured chances to play in the 2020 NBA playoffs, versus the Eastern Conference leaders Milwaukee Bucks.

On 10 March 2021, Valančiūnas logged a double-double with 29 points and 20 rebounds along with 4 blocks in a 127–112 win over the Washington Wizards, becoming the first player in franchise history to post at least 25 points, 20 rebounds and 4 blocks in a game. On 10 April, Valančiūnas tied a then career-high 34 points, along with 22 rebounds, in a 132–125 loss to the Indiana Pacers. On 12 April, Valančiūnas recorded his franchise-record, 15th consecutive double-double with 26 points and 14 rebounds to lead the Memphis Grizzlies past the Chicago Bulls 101–90. His record-setting streak of double-doubles surpassed a mark set by Zach Randolph in January 2011.

New Orleans Pelicans (2021–present)
On 7 August 2021, Valančiūnas was traded to the New Orleans Pelicans for Eric Bledsoe, Steven Adams, and a 2022 protected first round pick.  On 20 October, Valančiūnas signed a reported two-year, $30 million contract extension with the New Orleans Pelicans. On 29 November, Valančiūnas recorded a career-high 39 points on seven three-pointers made, along with 15 rebounds, in a 123–104 win over the Los Angeles Clippers.

National team career

Valančiūnas made his debut for the junior national team of Lithuania in the 2008 FIBA Europe Under-16 Championship in Italy. He dominated throughout the tournament, averaging 14.3 points, 11.1 rebounds and 2.3 blocks in 23.5 minutes of action. His team went on to win the gold medal and he was chosen as the MVP.

In the summer of 2009, Valančiūnas participated in the European Under-18 All-Star Game during EuroBasket 2009 in Poland. He dominated the game as he scored 18 points, grabbed 19 rebounds, blocked three shots and helped the "Blue Team" beat the "White Team" 77–75. Valančiūnas was later named the MVP of the All-Star game.

One year later, Valančiūnas led Lithuania to another gold medal. Lithuania dominated in the 2010 FIBA Europe Under-18 Championship held in Lithuania. Valančiūnas averaged 19.4 points, 13.4 rebounds and 2.7 blocks, and was voted as the MVP.

Valančiūnas was also a member of the Lithuanian Under-19 basketball team, which competed in the 2011 FIBA Under-19 World Cup in Latvia. He led his team to capture the gold medal, averaging 23.0 points, 13.9 rebounds and 3.2 blocks in 31 minutes of game action. He was later named the tournament MVP. Valančiūnas scored 36 points in the gold medal game against Serbia, which was the highest points scored in a game by any player in the tournament. To this date he is the only player to achieve an MVP and gold medal in all of his FIBA U-tournaments.

Valančiūnas was on the senior men's Lithuanian national basketball team roster for EuroBasket 2011, which took place in Lithuania. Valančiūnas debuted with Lithuania's senior men's national basketball team on 6 August 2011. In his debut match against Czech Republic, he scored 26 points and grabbed 11 rebounds. After a strong performance in friendly pre-EuroBasket 2011 matches, Valančiūnas was leading the Lithuanian national team with 12.3 points and 7.3 rebounds per game. Although Valančiūnas failed to be any kind of a leader in the first 4 games of EuroBasket 2011 (among them missing the game against Turkey), he then became one of the key players, averaging 8.4 points and 4.1 rebounds in just 15.7 minutes of game action. He also helped Lithuania to claim the fifth spot, which guaranteed qualification for the 2012 FIBA World Olympic Qualifying Tournament. To this day, he is the all-time youngest Lithuanian to represent the primary national team at the major tournament.

In 2013, Valančiūnas won a silver medal at the EuroBasket 2013 tournament. In the 2014 FIBA World Cup, Valančiūnas led the Lithuanian squad, which finished in fourth place. Valančiūnas was also one of the tournament's best players at EuroBasket 2015, and he was chosen to the All-Tournament Team, along with his Lithuanian teammate, Jonas Mačiulis, after averaging 16 points and 8.4 rebounds per game. The Lithuanian team won their second consecutive silver medal at the competition.

In 2017, Valančiūnas competed for the Lithuanian national basketball team at the EuroBasket 2017 tournament, where the team finished 9th overall. Valančiūnas averaged 15.8 points and 12 rebounds. He led in double-doubles and rebounds per game in the tournament.

In 2019, Valančiūnas represented the national team at the 2019 FIBA Basketball World Cup where Lithuania finished 9th overall. Valančiūnas led his team in total points and rebounds, averaging 14.0 points and 8.8 rebounds.

Career statistics

NBA

Regular season

|-
| style="text-align:left;"|
| style="text-align:left;"|Toronto
| 62 || 57 || 23.9 || .557 ||  || .789 || 6.0 || .7 || .3 || 1.3 || 8.9
|-
| style="text-align:left;"|
| style="text-align:left;"|Toronto
| 81 || 81 || 28.2 || .531 || .000 || .762 || 8.8 || .7 || .3 || .9 || 11.3
|-
| style="text-align:left;"|
| style="text-align:left;"|Toronto
| 80 || 80 || 26.2 || .572 || .000 || .786 || 8.7 || .5 || .4 || 1.2 || 12.0
|-
| style="text-align:left;"|
| style="text-align:left;"|Toronto
| 60 || 59 || 26.0 || .565 ||  || .761 || 9.1 || .7 || .4 || 1.3 || 12.8
|-
| style="text-align:left;"|
| style="text-align:left;"|Toronto
| 80 || 80 || 25.8 || .557 || .500 || .811 || 9.5 || .7 || .5 || .8 || 12.0
|-
| style="text-align:left;"|
| style="text-align:left;"|Toronto
| 77 || 77 || 22.4 || .568 || .405 || .806 || 8.6 || 1.1 || .4 || .9 || 12.7
|-
| style="text-align:left;"|
| style="text-align:left;"|Toronto
| 30 || 10 || 18.8 || .575 || .300 || .819 || 7.2 || 1.0 || .4 || .8 || 12.8
|-
| style="text-align:left;"|
| style="text-align:left;"|Memphis
| 19 || 17 || 27.7 || .545 || .278 || .769 || 10.7 || 2.2 || .3 || 1.6 || 19.9
|-
| style="text-align:left;"|
| style="text-align:left;"|Memphis
| 70 || 70 || 26.4 || .585 || .352 || .740 || 11.3 || 1.9 || .4 || 1.1 || 14.9
|-
| style="text-align:left;"|
| style="text-align:left;"|Memphis
| 62 || 61 || 28.3 || .592 || .368 || .773 || 12.5 || 1.8 || .6 || .9 || 17.1
|-
| style="text-align:left;"|
| style="text-align:left;"|New Orleans
| 74 || 74 || 30.3 || .544 || .361 || .820 || 11.4 || 2.6 || .6 || .8 || 17.8
|- class="sortbottom"
| style="text-align:center;" colspan="2"|Career
| 695 || 666 || 26.1 || .563 || .359 || .785 || 9.5 || 1.2 || .4 || 1.0 || 13.4

Playoffs

|-
| style="text-align:left;"|2014
| style="text-align:left;"|Toronto
| 7 || 7 || 28.6 || .633 ||  || .636 || 9.7 || .3 || .0 || 1.0 || 10.9
|-
| style="text-align:left;"|2015
| style="text-align:left;"|Toronto
| 4 || 4 || 26.5 || .500 ||  || .875 || 9.3 || .5 || .5 || .3 || 11.3
|-
| style="text-align:left;"|2016
| style="text-align:left;"|Toronto
| 12 || 10 || 26.8 || .567 ||  || .744 || 10.8 || .9 || .8 || 1.2 || 13.8
|-
| style="text-align:left;"|2017
| style="text-align:left;"|Toronto
| 10 || 6 || 22.6 || .543 || .000 || .727 || 6.7 || .2 || .2 || .6 || 11.2
|-
| style="text-align:left;"|2018
| style="text-align:left;"|Toronto
| 10 || 9 || 24.4 || .542 || .400 || .824 || 10.5 || 1.2 || .4 || 1.5 || 14.6
|-
| style="text-align:left;"|2021
| style="text-align:left;"|Memphis
| 5 || 5 || 33.2 || .569 || .250 || .875 || 9.8 || 2.6 || .6 || .6 || 15.0
|-
| style="text-align:left;"|2022
| style="text-align:left;"|New Orleans
| 6 || 6 || 29.2 || .485 || .167 || .769 || 14.3 || 3.0 || .7 || .2 || 14.5
|- class="sortbottom"
| style="text-align:center;" colspan="2"|Career
| 54 || 47 || 26.6 || .549 || .250 || .759 || 10.0 || 1.1 || .5 || .9 || 13.1

EuroLeague

|-
| style="text-align:left;"|2010–11
| style="text-align:left;"|Lietuvos Rytas
| 15 || 8 || 15.4 || .708 || .000 || .885 || 5.8 || .2 || .2 || .7 || 7.7 || 9.7
|- class="sortbottom"
| style="text-align:center;" colspan="2"|Career
| 15 || 8 || 15.4 || .708 || .000 || .885 || 5.8 || .2 || .2 || .7 || 7.7 || 9.7

Personal life
Valančiūnas and his wife have two sons.

Valančiūnas is the face of the "Itty Bitty Ballers" campaign, a campaign marketing miniature figurines with a basketball theme. The proceeds from the sale of the "Itty Bitty Ballers" goes to the MLSE Foundation charity. Also he has his own charity foundation, the Jonas Valančiūnas Foundation, which was established in May 2017. It is a non-profit organization with an aim to help adolescents with behavioral challenges. Adolescent's day home “Išvien” (United) was opened a year later, in August 2018.

Acting career
In 2012, Valančiūnas appeared in two basketball documentaries The Other Dream Team and, We are... for the Lithuania!. In 2016, Jonas Valančiūnas played a village thief in Lithuanian black comedy Received Call 3, in which he stole a plasma TV and a tiny police car.

See also
 List of European basketball players in the United States

References

External links

Jonas Valančiūnas at euroleague.net

1992 births
Living people
2014 FIBA Basketball World Cup players
2019 FIBA Basketball World Cup players
Basketball players at the 2012 Summer Olympics
Basketball players at the 2016 Summer Olympics
BC Rytas players
Centers (basketball)
Lithuanian expatriate basketball people in Canada
Lithuanian expatriate basketball people in the United States
Lithuanian men's basketball players
Memphis Grizzlies players
National Basketball Association players from Lithuania
New Orleans Pelicans players
Olympic basketball players of Lithuania
People from Utena
Toronto Raptors draft picks
Toronto Raptors players